The Strahlhorn (4190 m) is a mountain of the Pennine Alps, east of Zermatt and south of Saas Fee in Valais. It is also the name of several other mountains in Switzerland:

Strahlhorn (Baltschieder) (3200 m), part of the Bernese Alps, east of Bietschhorn and north of Baltschieder in Valais
Strahlhorn (Fieschertal) (3026 m), part of the Bernese Alps between Aletsch Gacier and Fieschertal in Valais
Strahlhorn (Niedergesteln) (3194 m), part of the Bernese Alps, south of Lötschental and west of Bietschhorn in Valais
Strahlhorn (Guttannen) (3156 m), part of Bernese Alps, east of Guttannen, next to Gwächtenhorn, between Trift Glacier and Hasli Valley.